This is a list of films produced and distributed by HBO Films.

Released

1980s

1990s

2000s

2010s

2020s

HBO Documentary Films

HBO Comedy Specials

Upcoming

References 

HBO Films films
HBO Films